Hogir Hirori, born May 7, 1980, in Duhuk, Kurdistan Region in Iraq is a Kurdish-Swedish film director, known for his award-winning documentaries, The Deminer 2017, about a Kurdish disarmer, and Sabaya 2021, about the liberation of enslaved Yazidi women from the terrorist sect IS.

The film Sabaya won the Guldbagge Awards 2021, and the director's award 2021 at Sundance Film Festival. It has been criticized for not being strictly documentary, scenes are arranged with women who did not want to be in the film.

Filmography
Sabaya (2021)
The Deminer (2017)
The girl who saved my life (2016)
Victims of IS (2014)
Hewa strongest in Sweden (2007)

References

External links
Hogir Hirori on IMDB.

Swedish filmmakers
1980 births
Living people
Swedish cinematographers
Swedish film directors
Best Director Guldbagge Award winners
People from Dohuk Province